The  hybrid cultivar  Ulmus 'Androssowii' R. Kam. (or 'Androsowii'), an elm of Uzbekistan sometimes referred to in old travel books as 'Turkestan Elm' or as 'karagach' [:black tree, = elm], its local name, is probably an artificial hybrid. According to Lozina-Lozinskaia the tree is unknown in the wild in Uzbekistan, and apparently arose from a crossing of U. densa var. bubyriana Litv. (:now Ulmus minor 'Umbraculifera'), which it resembles (see the disputed species Ulmus densa), and the Siberian Elm Ulmus pumila.

Not to be confused with the U. turkestanica Regel distributed by the Späth nursery of Berlin.

For U. 'Karagatch', see 'Hybrid cultivars' below.

For so-called Ulmus androssowii var. subhirsuta  C. K. Schneid.  and Ulmus androssowii var. virgata  (Planch.) Grudz. , see Ulmus chumlia.

Description

Its compact branch structure helps the tree conserve moisture.

Pests and diseases
Not known.

Cultivation
The hybrid has been widely planted in southern and western areas of the former Soviet Union, notably along the streets of Samarkand. In western Europe it was distributed by Hesse's Nurseries, Weener, Germany, in the 1930s. A specimen was present at Kew Gardens in the 1930s. Cold-hardy, it prefers a rich soil and moderate humidity.

Hybrid cultivars
Ulmus 'Karagatch' is a hybrid cultivar from Turkestan, selected in the early 20th century and said to be either a backcrossing of U. pumila and U. 'Androssowii' or simply a cultivar of 'Androssowi'.

Synonymy
Ulmus Androssowi:  Litv. in Schedae ad Herbarium Florae Rossicae 8: 23, no. 2445, t.2, 1922.
Ulmus pumila f. androssowii (Litv.) Rehd.

Accessions
North America
Morton Arboretum, Illinois, US. Acc. no. 353-72 (received as U. pumila f. androssowii (Litv.) Rehder).  
Europe
Grange Farm Arboretum, Sutton St James, Spalding, Lincolnshire, UK. Grafted cuttings acquired 2013. Acc. nos. 1095, 1096.
Hortus Botanicus Nationalis, Salaspils, Latvia. Acc. nos. 18165, 18166 (as U. pumila f. androssowii, both from Moscow).
Sir Harold Hillier Gardens, Romsey, UK. Acc. nos. 2016.0355, 2016.0356.

Nurseries
Europe
Pan-global Plants , Frampton on Severn, Gloucestershire, UK.

References

External links
Photographs of and information on 'karagach' in Uzbekistan, World Digital Library
 Formerly labelled U. pumila 'Androssowi' (Wageningen Arboretum, 1962)
 Formerly labelled U. pumila 'Androssowi' (Wageningen Arboretum, 1962)
 Ulmus, formerly mis-labelled U. angronovii (Kew specimen, 1935)

Hybrid elm cultivar
Ulmus articles with images